Perth railway station is a railway station located in the city of Perth, Scotland, on the Glasgow to Dundee line, and the Highland Main Line. It is managed by ScotRail, who provide almost all of the services (along with LNER and the Caledonian Sleeper).

History

Openings

The station was opened (as Perth General) by the Scottish Central Railway in 1848.

All of these lines, apart from the E&NR would eventually be taken over by the Caledonian Railway, though the Highland Railway (which took over the P&DR) and North British Railway (which absorbed the E&NR) also had access by means of running powers from Stanley Junction and Hilton Junction respectively.

Trains could then travel via , Dunfermline and the newly opened Forth Rail Bridge to reach Edinburgh.

Closures

The Almond Valley line to  &  was an early post-nationalisation casualty, closing to passengers in October 1951. The Ladybank service followed suit in September 1955. The major losses though came as the result of the Beeching Axe and its aftermath in the mid-to-late 1960s, with the main line to Aberdeen (i.e. the ex-SMJR main line to Kinnaber Junction via  and Forfar) being closed to passenger traffic on 4 September 1967. Aberdeen services were thereafter routed via Dundee and the former NBR route via . The Aviemore to Forres section of the Highland Main Line had already been closed two years earlier, and several local stations in the area were also shut down around this time.

A further significant (and controversial) closure came on 5 January 1970, when the main line to Edinburgh via Glenfarg, Kinross and Cowdenbeath was abandoned in favour of the older but less direct line via Stirling. The Glenfarg route had been recommended for retention and development in the Beeching Report, but its removal allowed the planned M90 motorway to occupy its former alignment in the Glenfarg area when the motorway was built a few years later. However, the longer journey via Stirling proved unpopular with Edinburgh travellers and so in 1975, the old E&NR line to Ladybank was reopened by British Rail to provide a slightly quicker alternative. This is the route followed by most Edinburgh services today, but the daytime and overnight trains to London (see below) still run via Stirling and Falkirk as the line via Ladybank and Kirckaldy is served by the Aberdeen to London services.

Location 
Perth bus station is situated approximately 100 metres northeast along Leonard Street, part of the A989, from the railway station.

Platform layout
The station has seven active platforms, but they are split into two distinct sections:

 Platforms 1 and 2 sit on the eastern side (the old Dundee & Perth Railway part of the station) and are the busiest in the station as they handle the Glasgow to Dundee and Aberdeen trains. The two platform lines then become single further east to cross the bridge spanning the Tay. Platform 3, which adjoins platform 2, is a through platform that sees a few terminating services from the south, although it can be accessed form the north from the Highland Main Line.

 The remainder of the platforms (4–7) sit under the main train shed, the former HR/SMJR platforms once used by the Coupar Angus main line as well as services to the Highlands. These platforms are an island in the shape of the letter H, with two long platforms along each side - the present platforms 4 and 7. Platforms 5 and 6 are the bays at the southern end of the island. Originally, there were also two bay platforms at the northern end which are no longer used, but part of the track is now a siding for fuelling trains. Platforms 4–7 now are used only by around a dozen trains per day each way on the Highland Main Line, and some terminating services.

There was once an extensive goods yard at Perth, along with an engine shed and carriage sidings but only a small engineers depot remains in the greatly downsized yard.

Passenger volume 

The statistics cover twelve month periods that start in April.

Services 
Passenger services are operated by ScotRail, Caledonian Sleeper, and London North Eastern Railway.

There are two main routes passing through the station - the Glasgow to Dundee & Aberdeen Line, and the Highland Main Line, whilst there is now also a regular service to/from Edinburgh via the Fife Coast. Services on weekdays are as follows:

 40 trains per day to Glasgow Queen Street
 35 trains per day to Dundee, with 15 extending to Aberdeen, three to Arbroath, one to Inverurie and one to Inverness
 26 trains per day to Edinburgh, including the LNER Highland Chieftain, and the Caledonian Sleeper
 11 trains per day to Inverness, including the LNER Highland Chieftain, and the Caledonian Sleeper

On Sundays, services are reduced to:

 13 trains per day to Glasgow Queen Street
 10 trains per day to Aberdeen
 8 trains per day to Edinburgh including the LNER Highland Chieftain, and the Caledonian Sleeper
 7 trains per day to Inverness, including the LNER Highland Chieftain, two of which extend to Elgin
 1 train per day to Dundee

Cultural References
The movie The Railway Man was filmed at Perth station. Platform 3 was used to pose as Crewe and Platform 5 used to pose as Edinburgh, both set during the 1960s.

Perth station was nominated the Carbuncle Award in 2015, which recognizes the worst planning decision. The award was due to the fact a new footbridge had to be built at the southern end of the station which has stair and lift access to all platforms to comply with disability laws. Local newspaper The Courier reported on the news and interviewed Paul Tetlaw from the campaign Transform Scotland. He said:

"It's an off-the-shelf structure that has desecrated the station environment, imposed from London by 'standards bound' Network Rail designers and has no fit with the largely Victorian surroundings. To add insult to injury, it's virtually unused, as the alternatives within the station building are vastly more convenient for the overwhelming majority of passengers. This tacky and inappropriate new structure is thought to have cost in excess of £1m — money which would have been better spent on opening a new station in nearby Newburgh, which has none, with cash left over for a feasibility study of recreating a direct Perth-Edinburgh link, as advocated by our inter-city express campaign."

Future proposals 
In March 2016, Transport Scotland announced a package of timetable improvements for the Scottish rail network that would see additional trains operated from Perth to Glasgow, Edinburgh, Dundee & Inverness from 2018.  There would be a two-hourly service between both Edinburgh & Glasgow and Inverness over the Highland Main Line (combining to give an hourly frequency north of Perth) and additional regional services from Arbroath & Dundee to Glasgow serving Gleneagles, Dunblane & Stirling on top of the current Aberdeen to Glasgow route (which will be accelerated by cutting some of the existing intermediate stops). As of May 2022, these improvements have still not taken place.

See also
List of listed buildings in Perth, Scotland

Footnotes

References

Bibliography

External links 

 , description of the station in the 1930s

Railway stations in Perth, Scotland
Former Caledonian Railway stations
Railway stations in Great Britain opened in 1848
Railway stations served by ScotRail
Railway stations served by Caledonian Sleeper
Railway stations served by London North Eastern Railway
William Tite railway stations
Listed railway stations in Scotland
Category B listed buildings in Perth and Kinross
Listed buildings in Perth, Scotland